"Lipslap" is a song by Kero Kero Bonito, being the second single from their first studio album Bonito Generation (2016).

Background and release
"Lipslap" was released on 26 September 2016. The Makeness remix was released as a part of the EP Bonito Retakes (Remixes) on 30 May 2017.

Music video
The official video for the song was released on 7 March 2016 and uploaded to YouTube. It was directed by Theo Davies (who would also direct the video for the band's song "Trampoline"). The video is stylized as an absurd sitcom, with the band members doing nonsense around the house.

Reception
Leah Levinson of Tiny Mix Tapes argues that "Lipslap" is best understood through the lens of cultural theorist Sianne Ngai, writing: "Sarah Bonito takes the space provided by the beat for her own self-empowerment, protesting the inherent violence of cuteness (the cute object is registered as subordinate to the subject that judged it so) as well as demonstrating the cute subject's quick slippage to monstrosity".

Release history

References

2016 singles
2016 songs
Kero Kero Bonito songs